John Phillip James (born July 23, 1933) is a former Major League Baseball relief pitcher who played for the New York Yankees and Los Angeles Angels between  and . He attended the University of Southern California.

He played only one game in his debut season, 1958. Appearing in relief for Art Ditmar (who had given up seven earned runs in six innings of work) on September 6, James pitched three innings of scoreless baseball, walking four batters and striking out one. He also had one at-bat in that game, and struck out.

He did not play in the major leagues in 1959, but he did appear in 28 games in relief for the Yankees in 1960. He earned a spot on the team by being a part of a spring training no-hitter. In 43 innings of work, he posted a 5–1 record, allowing 21 earned runs and striking out 29 batters. He walked 26. He also saved two games.

1961 would end up being his final season in the majors. He pitched in only one game for the Yankees that year before being traded to the Angels with Ryne Duren for Tex Clevenger and Bob Cerv on May 8. In 36 games with the Angels, he posted a 5.30 ERA. Overall that season, he walked 54 batters and struck out 43. His record was 0–2. James gave up the 20th home run of Roger Maris' then record-setting 61 home run season.

His career ended on October 1 of that year. He had a 5–3 record in 66 career games, starting 3 games. In 119 innings of work, he walked 84 and struck out 73, finishing with a 4.76 ERA. Although he did not collect a single hit in 17 at-bats (and struck out 8 times), he did score three runs. He was a perfect fielder, handling 25 total chances (4 putouts, 21 assists) for a 1.000 fielding percentage.

He wore three numbers in his career: 27 in 1958, 53 in 1959 and 1960, and 22 in 1961.

References

External links

Baseball Library

1933 births
Living people
Baseball players from Idaho
Boise Yankees players
Binghamton Triplets players
Birmingham Barons players
Dallas Rangers players
Hawaii Islanders players
Los Angeles Angels players
Major League Baseball pitchers
Modesto Reds players
New York Yankees players
People from Bonners Ferry, Idaho
Richmond Virginians (minor league) players
USC Trojans baseball players
Tri-City Braves players
Hollywood High School alumni